Penchalakona is a village located in the Rapur Mandal of Nellore district in Andhra Pradesh, India, 70km west of Nellore.

History & Legend of the Temple
The Penusila Lakshmi Narasimha Swamy Temple is situated at the foot of a hill in the Penchalakona Valley. There is an image of the Lord, represented as a self-manifested one (Swayambhu). Two stones are entwined to form a lion’s head upon a man's body. The "Sthalapurana", or ancient story, of the temple indicates that it was a famed for the swami “Thapovan of Kanvamaharshi” who performed penance there.

There is an annual festival at the temple, which is a major event in Penchalakona, celebrated during Vaisakha, the period of time in the Hindu solar calendar that begins in mid-April in Bengal, Nepal, and Punjab. It starts on the day of Suddha Dwadasi and lasts until Bahula Padyami, a total of five days. Devotees congregate for Narasimhaswamy Jayanthi to celebrate the occasion.

References

External links
 http://www.penchalakona.co.in/
 https://gotirupati.com/penchalakona-lakshmi-narasimha-swamy-temple/

Villages in Nellore district
Waterfalls of Andhra Pradesh
Geography of Nellore district